Out of Liberty is a 2019 film directed by Garrett Batty, starring Jasen Wade as deputy jailer Samuel Tillery. The film tells the story of Joseph Smith (Brandon Ray Olive), his brother Hyrum Smith (Casey Elliott), and four other men being held in Liberty Jail while they await trial for treason.  The film's main character, played by Jasen Wade, is the jail's deputy jailer, Samuel Tillery. The film was produced out of a movie producing industry in Utah the New York Times called a "Mini-Hollywood". Descendants of Joseph Smith were included in an early screening.

Based on true accounts, the film tells its story using elements from western, prison-break, and Latter-day Saint film genres.

Plot

Synopsis
"On the American frontier, Joseph Smith and five other prisoners’ attempt to escape the dungeon of Liberty Jail as they are repeatedly thwarted by deputy jailer Samuel Tillery. While keeping the prisoners inside, Samuel is also busy keeping angry mobs outside from breaking in and killing the prisoners. As Samuel tries to keep the prisoners safely in jail until their day in court arrives, he begins to wonder whether or not justice might be given to them better in some other way."

Detailed
The film opens with Joseph Smith speaking with his lawyer Alexander Doniphan about he and his fellow prisoner's upcoming trial. Below them, in the dungeon of the jail, the other five prisoners are planning an escape attempt. When the lawyer leaves, and the prisoners are brought up alongside Joseph, this first escape attempt fails, as Lyman Wight is too sick to make it out the door – and the prisoners decide they cannot leave without him.

The next day, before another escape attempt, the prisoners receive visitors – Porter Rockwell and Cyrus Daniels. This second escape attempt, like the first, fails when Tillery and his two guards fight against the prisoners and keep them locked inside.  Hearing of this escape attempt, a mob from nearby Liberty comes for some frontier justice, to kill the prisoners for their escape attempt. The prisoners are defended by the jailer.

Rockwell later returns to give the prisoners tools with which they begin to tunnel out of jail – the beginning of a third escape attempt.

During the process of their tunneling out of jail, a court of inquiry is held in which it is decided if the prisoners will go to trial for treason. Court is held in a schoolhouse, as a mob intent on killing the prisoners prevented them from being brought into the courthouse, and the mob shows up to the courthouse to threaten the judge and the prisoners if the prisoners are to be let free. During the trial, Sidney Rigdon, representing himself, convinces Judge Turnham to let him free.  The other prisoners return to jail.

It is discovered that the prisoners are tunneling out of jail, and their hole is filled in.

In a moment of despair, Smith prays for guidance, and receives comfort through revelation. This is the revelation later canonized in the Doctrine and Covenants scriptures.

As the prisoners are being transported to another jail for trial there is a final showdown between the mob, the jailer, and the prisoners. After this showdown the prisoners are allowed to escape, by their jailer, Samuel Tillery.

Cast
 Jasen Wade as Samuel Tillery
 Brandon Ray Olive as Joseph Smith 
 Casey Elliott as Hyrum Smith
 Brock Roberts as Sidney Rigdon
 Morgan Gunter as Lyman Wight
 Adam Johnson as Caleb Baldwin
 Danny James as Alexander McRae
 Corbin Allred as Porter Rockwell

Reception (all of these reviews from Mormon sources)
Sean P. Means of The Salt Lake Tribune gave the film 3/4 stars, noting Brandon Ray Olive's "quiet soulfulness" in his portrayal of Joseph Smith.

Margaret Blair Young said Out of Liberty is, "one of the most significant films of the past decade, particularly for Latter-day Saints," and that it is "a film which every LDS family (and perhaps every family) should see and take its children to see–ages twelve and up."

Rachel Wagner gave the film 8.5/10 stars and said it is, "a well written, moving character piece that is both a study of faith and a Western jailbreak survival story."

The film won second place at the 2020 LDS Film Festival's "Feature Film Competition" behind T. C. Christensen's film The Fighting Preacher.

The film was nominated for eight Utah Film Nominations through the Utah Film Awards. Those nominations were in: Picture, Director, Ensemble Cast, Actor, Supporting Actor, Cinematography, Music and Sound.

References

External links

2019 films
Mormon cinema
Works about Joseph Smith
Films about prison escapes
American prison drama films
2010s English-language films
2010s American films